Cinquefrondi (Calabrian:  or ) is a comune (municipality) in the Metropolitan City of Reggio Calabria in the Italian region Calabria, located about  southwest of Catanzaro and about  northeast of Reggio Calabria.  

Cinquefrondi borders the following municipalities: Anoia, Giffone, Mammola, Polistena, San Giorgio Morgeto. It is part of the Aspromonte National Park.

Geography

Climate

References

External links
 Official website

Cities and towns in Calabria